The Gov. Thomas Bennett House is a National Register property located at 69 Barre St. in Charleston, South Carolina.  It was built in approximately 1825 on land which had once belonged to architect and builder Thomas Bennett, Sr. (1754-1814). It was named to the National Register of Historic Places in 1978.

History
Thomas Bennett, Sr.'s son, Thomas Bennett, Jr. (1781-1865), took over his father's lumber and milling business but was also active in state and local politics.  He was superintendent of Charleston, South Carolina; a member of the South Carolina House of Representatives (and was its speaker from 1814 to 1818); a member of the South Carolina Senate; and governor of the state.  After his term as governor, Thomas Bennett, Jr. undertook the construction of this notable house on land which originally overlooked the rice and saw mills which he owned.

Architecture
 The interior is notable for its Regency details.  There is a cantilevered stair; the only other cantilevered staircase in Charleston is at the Nathaniel Russell House at 51 Meeting St. The house's floorplan is a basic double house.

References

Sources
Robert Stockton, Information for Guides of Historic Charleston, South Carolina 98-99 (1985).

Houses on the National Register of Historic Places in South Carolina
Houses completed in 1825
National Register of Historic Places in Charleston, South Carolina
Houses in Charleston, South Carolina